Barbara Owens (1934, Carrollton, Illinois – 2008, San Jose, California) was a psychological suspense writer. 

Owens was the winner of the Mystery Writers of America Best Short Story Edgar Award for 1979 for her story "The Cloud Beneath The Eaves", which originally appeared in the January 1978 issue of Ellery Queen's Mystery Magazine. It was her first short story.

Her short story "The New Man" was the basis for the first episode of the TV series Tales from the Darkside.

References

1934 births
2008 deaths
American mystery writers
Edgar Award winners
American women novelists
20th-century American novelists
20th-century American women writers
Women mystery writers
20th-century American short story writers
21st-century American women